Alexander Wood may refer to:

 Alexander Wood (physician) (1817–1884), physician and inventor of the hypodermic needle
 Alexander Wood (merchant) (1772–1844), city magistrate forced to leave Upper Canada in 1810 following allegations of scandal
 Alexander Wood (soccer) (1907–1987), member of the American Soccer Hall of Fame
 Alexander Wood (physicist) (1879–1950), university lecturer in the field of acoustics and experimental physics
 Alexander T. Wood, 19th-century architect of the United States Custom House (New Orleans)
 Alexander Wood (footballer) (1906–?), Scottish footballer
 Alexander Wood (surgeon) (1725–1807), Edinburgh surgeon
 Alexander Wood, Lord Wood (1788–1864), Scottish law lord
 Alexander Wood (rugby union) (1848–1905), Scottish rugby union player

See also
Alex Wood (disambiguation)
Alexander Woods or Big Scarr (2000–2022), American rapper
Alex Woods (disambiguation)